Matthew K. "Matt" Shaughnessy (born September 23, 1986) is a former American football defensive end. He was drafted by the Oakland Raiders in the third round of the 2009 NFL Draft. He played college football at Wisconsin.

Early years
Shaughnessy attended the Norwich Free Academy in Norwich, Connecticut and graduated in 2005. He earned Super Prep All-American honors and was rated one of the top 30 defensive ends in the nation, according to Rivals.com. He was named to the Connecticut High School Coaches Association and New Haven Register All-State teams in 2004. Also, he earned All-Conference and All-Area accolades in each of his three final seasons, adding three more letters in basketball and two in track. He also played in the Connecticut vs Rhode Island All-Star Football Game as a Defensive End, earning the CT Defensive Player of the Game.

College career
Shaughnessy played in 50 games and started 46 games at Wisconsin, recording 174 tackles (109 solos) with 18.5 sacks, 41.5 stops for losses and 22 quarterback pressures. He also caused and recovered one fumble while also deflecting nine passes. As a senior in 2008 he was
honorable mention All-Big Ten Conference after recorded 40 tackles (29 solo) with four sacks and eight stops for losses and 10 quarterback pressures and deflected four passes. In 2007, he was a Second-team All-Big Ten Conference and the team's Defensive Most Valuable Player. he started all 13 games at right defensive end and made 18.0 stops for losses and a career-high 60 tackles (41 solos) with five sacks, three pass deflections and four pressures.  The year before, in 2005, he was First-team Freshman All-American honors from The Sporting News and ESPN.com and an honorable mention All-Big Ten Conference after appearing in 11 games, starting seven, at right defensive end and finishing with 39 tackles (20 solos), 2.5 sacks, five pressures, 7.5 stops for losses and a pair of pass deflections.

Professional career

Oakland Raiders

He was drafted by the Raiders in the third round of the 2009 NFL Draft.  He signed a 4-year contract on July 20, 2009.

As a rookie in 2009, Shaughnessy played in all 16 regular season games for the Raiders, starting two. He recorded 4 sacks and 29 tackles (26 of them solo). In 2010, he played in all 16 games, starting in eight. He recorded 56 tackles (43 of them solo, 13 assisted), 7 sacks, and forced 2 fumbles. His 2011 season was cut short after a Week 3 injury against the Jets.  He would be placed on injured reserve weeks after thus ending his season.

Arizona Cardinals
On March 15, 2013, Shaughnessy signed with the Arizona Cardinals. On September 5, 2015, he was released by the Cardinals.

New Orleans Saints
On August 3, 2016, Shaughnessy signed with the New Orleans Saints.

NFL career statistics

References

External links
Oakland Raiders bio

1986 births
Living people
American football linebackers
American football defensive ends
Wisconsin Badgers football players
Oakland Raiders players
Arizona Cardinals players
New Orleans Saints players
Players of American football from Connecticut
Sportspeople from Norwich, Connecticut